Trelleborg Municipality (Trelleborgs kommun) is the southernmost municipality of Sweden, in Skåne County. Its seat is located in the city  Trelleborg.

The present municipality was created in 1967 through the amalgamation of the City of Trelleborg with five rural municipalities. It consists of over thirty original local government units.

The municipality boasts 35 kilometers of predominantly sandy beach in the south, beech woods to the north, and in between one of the most fertile soils in the world.

Localities
There are 8 urban areas (also called a Tätort or locality) in Trelleborg Municipality.

In the table they are listed according to the size of the population as of December 31, 2005. The municipal seat is in bold characters.

Elections
Below are the results since the 1973 municipal reform listed. Between 1988 and 1998 the Sweden Democrats' results were not published by the SCB due to the party's small size nationwide. "Turnout" denotes the percentage of the electorate casting a ballot, but "Votes" only applies to valid ballots cast.

Riksdag

Blocs

This lists the relative strength of the socialist and centre-right blocs since 1973, but parties not elected to the Riksdag are inserted as "other", including the Sweden Democrats results from 1988 to 2006, but also the Christian Democrats pre-1991 and the Greens in 1982, 1985 and 1991. The sources are identical to the table above. The coalition or government mandate marked in bold formed the government after the election. New Democracy got elected in 1991 but are still listed as "other" due to the short lifespan of the party. "Elected" is the total number of percentage points from the municipality that went to parties who were elected to the Riksdag.

References
Statistics Sweden

External links 

 Trelleborg Municipality - Official site

Municipalities of Skåne County
Municipalities in the Øresund Region